The discography of James Blundell consists of twelve studio albums and two compilation albums. As of 2010, his albums have sold more than 400,000 copies.

Studio albums

Compilation albums

Tribute albums

Singles

Music videos

References

See also

Country music discographies
Discographies of Australian artists